Knockbain is a parish on the Black Isle, in the county of Ross and Cromarty in Highland council area, Scotland. It includes the villages of North Kessock, Munlochy and Kilmuir.

The parishes of Kilmuir Wester and Suddie were united in the 1750s, to form the parish of Knockbain.

There are multiple  listed buildings in Knockbain, Highland.

Churches and cemeteries in Knockbain.

References

Parishes in Ross and Cromarty
Populated places in Ross and Cromarty
Black Isle